NK Željezničar may refer to:

NK Željezničar Pridjel Gornji
NK Željezničar Markovac Našički, Markovac Našički
NK Željezničar Moravice, Moravice
NK Željezničar Zagreb, Zagreb

See also
NK Železničar (disambiguation)
FK Željezničar (disambiguation)
FK Železničar (disambiguation)